The  was a eunuch official in the Byzantine court, responsible for the security and maintenance of the buildings of the imperial palaces in Constantinople. He commanded an extensive staff and performed in important role in palace ceremonies.

History and role
It is first attested in a seal dated to circa 550–650, and next recorded in the chronicle of Theophanes the Confessor for the year 780. The latter was created by Emperor Michael III, while the former is attested only in Philotheos's Kletorologion of 899. The  of the Great Palace was a very important official. He thus controlled physical access to the imperial quarters, and was an important element in any conspiracy against the emperor's life, as demonstrated in the usurpations of Michael II in 820 and Basil I in 867.

Aside from the ritual unlocking of the palace doors, he for instance formally ended the daily imperial audiences by rattling the keys, the symbol of his office. At ceremonies for the promotion of officials, he censed the main audience hall of the Chrysotriklinos and the emperor, and on August 1, he carried a cross in procession through the streets of the capital, visiting the most wealthy citizens and receiving donations.

New  for the Chalke and the new Blachernae Palace are also attested in the 12th century. In the 13th century, it was probably an actual office, but it became a purely honorary title in the 14th century.

Subordinate officials
The subordinates of the  included:

They were chamberlains responsible for the various rooms of each palace. Further,  of various buildings of the Great Palace complex are also attested in the 10th century: of the palaces of Daphne and Magnaura, the halls of the Consistory, the Ostiarikon, the Stratorikion, and the Nineteen Couches and of the palace chapels of St. Stephen and the Theotokos.

References

Sources

 
 
 
 
 

Byzantine palace offices
Byzantine titles and offices reserved for eunuchs
Historical management occupations